The Firebird is a 1952 Swedish-Italian musical drama film directed by Hasse Ekman. The film is inspired by The Red Shoes by Powell and Pressburger.

Plot summary
A famous Italian tenor gets an offer to make a guest appearance in Sweden, but is unwilling to go, until he sees a Swedish dance film with the beautiful ballerina Linda Corina. He travels to the Royal Opera in Stockholm, and falls in love with her. And so, a passionate and colourful drama begins.

Cast
Tito Gobbi as Mario Vanni, Italian operasinger
Ellen Rasch as Linda Corina, prima ballerina
Eva Henning as Alice Lund
Bengt Blomgren as Frank
Georg Rydeberg as Jascha Sacharowitch
Åke Falck as Spinky, Vannis impresario
Märta Arbin as Frank's mother
Alan Blair as Johan A. Sjöberg, Lindas doctor
Märta Dorff as Seamstress at the Operan
Gull Natorp as Tilda, dresser at the Operan
Björn Holmgren as John, Dancer
Gun Skoogberg as Dancer
Maurice Béjart as Alex, Dancer

External links

1952 films
1952 musical films
Swedish musical films
Italian musical films
1950s Swedish-language films
English-language Swedish films
English-language Italian films
Films directed by Hasse Ekman
Films about ballet
Films about opera
1950s English-language films
1950s Swedish films
1950s Italian films